Oktyabrskaya Gotnya is a rural locality (a selo) and the administrative center of Oktyabrsko-Gotnyanskoye Rural Settlement, Borisovsky District, Belgorod Oblast, Russia. The population was 334 as of 2010. There are 5 streets.

Geography 
Oktyabrskaya Gotnya is located 19 km northwest of Borisovka (the district's administrative centre) by road. Fedoseykin is the nearest rural locality.

References 

Rural localities in Borisovsky District